Palazzo Querini Benzon is a palace in Venice located in the San Marco district and overlooking the Grand Canal. It is placed between the small Casa De Sprit and Casa Tornielli (also called Ca 'Michiel), at the confluence of the Ca' Michiel stream. Opposite are Palazzo Bernardo and Palazzo Querini Dubois.

History
Built in the early 18th century, the palace takes the place of a structure previously demolished. The palazzo became famous thanks to the noblewoman Marina Querini (1757–1839), a wife of Pietro Giovanni Benzon, who, in the final period the Republic of Venice (1797), made her residence one of the most renowned literary salons in the city, thanks to the attendance of many important artists of the time, including Lord Byron, Thomas Moore, Ugo Foscolo, and Giacomo Casanova. Today the palace is considered a UNESCO World Heritage Site.

Architecture
The building of no particular architectural merits has a water portal with a staircase, a noble floor with a quadrifora flanked by pairs of monoforas. All the openings are decorated with balconies. The second floor was added in 1897 as an imitation of the noble floor. Above the cornice, in a central position, there is a balustraded terrace. The ground floor is covered with stone; the rest of the facade is plastered. The facade is simmetrically decorated with six pateras.

References

External links

Houses completed in the 18th century
Palaces in Sestiere San Marco
Renaissance architecture in Venice